Carnival Is Forever is the fifth studio album by Polish death metal band Decapitated. It was released on 12 July 2011 via Nuclear Blast. Carnival Is Forever was produced by Wacław "Vogg" Kiełtyka with Daniel Bergstrand.

Carnival Is Forever is Decapitated's first album to feature vocalist Rafał "Rasta" Piotrowski, and their only album to feature bassist Filip "Heinrich" Hałucha and drummer Kerim "Krimh" Lechner.

Background
In 2009, after a period of disbandment, Decapitated's guitarist, composer and founding member Wacław "Vogg" Kiełtyka reformed the band with Austrian drummer Kerim "Krimh" Lechner, vocalist Rafał Piotrowski, and bassist Filip "Heinrich" Hałucha. Throughout 2010, the band toured in Europe, United States, Australia and New Zealand.

Decapitated entered RG Studio in Gdańsk, Poland on 9 February 2011 to record Carnival Is Forever, the follow-up to Organic Hallucinosis (2006). The album was produced by Kiełtyka, and the drum tracks were recorded with Daniel Bergstrand. In order to achieve "the 'true', organic and natural sound", the band recorded with live drums (without using drum triggers) and without double guitar tracks.

Several riffs on the new album were created with previous drummer Witold "Vitek" Kiełtyka. The almost two-month recording session finished on 31 March. The cover art was created by Łukasz Jaszak. The lyrics were contributed by Jarosław Szubrycht, the vocalist for Lux Occulta.

Critical reception

Eduardo Rivadavia of AllMusic said "[...] implausibly heavy, musically vicious and polyrhythmically busy numbers such as "The Knife," "United," "404," and "Pest" (all of which owe a trick or two to Meshuggah, Gojira, and even Byzantine) appear to be at war with themselves—such is the instrumental complexity displayed by each musician as he fights to out-shred his bandmates." Dave Schalek of About.com noted Decapitated musicians skills "[...] the quality of the musicianship is as high as ever. Vogg’s riffing and staccato time changes are tight and flawlessly played, and drummer Krimh fills out the sound with perfect accompaniment to Vogg’s frenetic riffing."

Scott Alisoglu of Blabbermouth.net also praised musicianship: "In what turns out to be an ace rhythm section, bassist Filip Halucha and Kerim "Krimh" Lechner deliver the rhythmic goods in the form of tight, acrobatic performances and some very colorful percussion that both contrasts and syncs up with all those gouging and biting Waclaw riffs."

Track listing

Personnel

Decapitated
 Rafał "Rasta" Piotrowski – vocals
 Wacław "Vogg" Kiełtyka – guitars, production
 Filip "Heinrich" Hałucha – bass
 Kerim "Krimh" Lechner – drums

Additional musicians
 Bartosz Hervy	(Blindead) – keyboards

Production
 Jarosław Szubrycht – lyrics
 Daniel Bergstrand – mixing, drum production  
 Arkadiusz "Malta" Malczewski – engineering
 Rickard Sporrong – mastering
 Łukasz Jaszak – cover, design, photos
 Wojciech Kiełtyka – consultant, help, lyric revision

Charts

Release history

References

External links
Drum-Tracking Footage From The Studio - Mar. 25, 2011 Studio preview for SickDrummerMagazine.com at Blabbermouth.net. 

2011 albums
Decapitated (band) albums
Nuclear Blast albums